CJXR-FM, branded as Country 107.7, is a radio station which broadcasts a country format on 107.7 FM in Steinbach, Manitoba, Canada. The station, owned by Golden West Broadcasting, received approval from the Canadian Radio-television and Telecommunications Commission (CRTC) on June 28, 2013. The station broadcasts with an effective radiated power of 30,000 watts (non-directional antenna with an effective height of antenna above average terrain of 117.4 metres).

References

External links

CJXR-FM history - Canadian Communication Foundation

JXR
JXR
JXR
Mass media in Steinbach, Manitoba